Reighardia sternae,  also known as the larid pentastome, is a small internal parasitic crustacean. It is the  only Pentastomida species to use gulls and terns as hosts, living in the body cavity and air sacs.

References

Maxillopoda
Crustaceans described in 1864
Parasites of birds